Uranium chloride may refer to:

 Uranium trichloride (uranium(III) chloride), UCl3
 Uranium tetrachloride (uranium(IV) chloride), UCl4
 Uranium pentachloride (uranium(V) chloride), UCl5
 Uranium hexachloride (uranium(VI) chloride), UCl6